People of God is a term used in the Hebrew Bible to refer to the Israelites and used in Christianity to refer to Christians.

In the Bible

Hebrew Bible and Old Testament
The phrases "the people of the Lord" and "the people of the Lord your God" are also used. In those texts God is also represented as speaking of the Israelites as "my people". The people of God was a term first used by God in the Book of Exodus, which carried stipulation in this covenant between man and God.

New Testament

Christianity
Continued use of the expression "people of God" (in Latin, populus Dei) in the writings of the Church Fathers are found in Augustine's De civitate Dei and Pope Leo I's Lenten Sermon. Its use continued up to and including Pope John XXIII's apostolic letter Singulari studio of 1 July 1960, two years before the Second Vatican Council.

In Gaelic, Latin populus Dei became pobal Dé and has continued for centuries to be an expression in everyday use for the Church in a parish, a diocese or the world.

Catholic Church

Second Vatican Council
The phrase has been given greater prominence within the Catholic Church because of its employment in documents of the Second Vatican Council (1962–1965).

The dogmatic constitution Lumen gentium devoted its chapter II to "the new People of God", "a people made up of Jew and gentile", called together by Christ (section 9). It spoke of "the people to whom the testament and the promises were given and from whom Christ was born according to the flesh" as among those who "are related in various ways to the people of God" (section 16). It described in detail the qualities of this People of God in words "intended for the laity, religious and clergy alike" (section 30), while also pointing out the specific duties and functions of the different ranks of which it is composed, such as that of "those who exercise the sacred ministry for the good of their brethren" (section 13).

In 2001, Cardinal Joseph Ratzinger, who was to become Pope Benedict XVI in 2005, stated that the council's choice of this term reflected three perspectives. The principal one was to introduce a term that could serve as an ecumenical bridge, recognizing intermediate degrees of belonging to the church. Another was to put more in evidence the human element in the church, which is also part of her nature. And the third was to recall that the church has not yet reached her final state and that she "will not be wholly herself until the paths of time have been traversed and have blossomed in the hands of God".

Ratzinger also declared that the term is not to be understood in way that would reduce it "to an a-theological and purely sociological view" of the church. Michael Hesemann wrote:

While the council distinguished between the Jewish people and "the new People of God", Carl E. Braaten has said that, being somewhat analogous to the expression "chosen people", the term "People of God" suggests a persisting trend of supersessionism in the church, and that the expression "People of God" implying that the church is the same people as Abraham, Isaac and Jacob in the Hebrew Bible.

Since the Second Vatican Council
Pope Paul VI used the phrase with regard to his profession of faith known as the Credo of the People of God. Pope John Paul II used it in his catechetical instructions, teaching that the church is the new people of God. Pope Benedict XVI has spoken of "the Church, the people of God throughout the world, united in faith and love and empowered by the Spirit to bear witness to the risen Christ to the ends of the earth". On 20 August 2018, Pope Francis released a letter, addressed to the "People of God", in response to recent revelations of sexual abuse cases within the Church, quoting St. Paul: "If one member suffers, all suffer together with it".

The concluding messages of each General Assembly of the Synod of Bishops are addressed to "the People of God."

Catechism
The Catechism of the Catholic Church devotes a section to describing the church with this phrase, and indicates the characteristics of the people of God "that distinguish it from all other religious, ethnic, political, or cultural groups found in history", so that it does not belong to any one of these groups. Membership in the people of God, it says, comes not by physical birth but by faith in Christ and baptism.

See also

 Christian Church
 Communitas perfecta, doctrinal theories regarding the Catholic Church
 Divine filiation, Christian doctrine regarding Jesus and Christians
 Jews as the chosen people
 Mystici corporis Christi, 1943 papal encyclical stating that the Mystical Body of Christ is identical with the Catholic Church
Supersessionism, the Christian doctrine which asserts that the New Covenant through Jesus Christ supersedes the Old Covenant, which was made exclusively with the Jewish people.

References

Christian terminology
Second Vatican Council